Okaba is a coastal town in Merauke Regency, South Papua, Indonesia.

History
 
The village was established as a government post and a police station in 1907 by the Dutch, not long after the foundation of Merauke in 1902. The goal was to stop Marind-anim headhunting raids in the area. In July 1910, a catholic mission was founded there by the Dutch priest Jos van der Kolk. Although the mission shut down in 1915, it reopened in 1922, under the supervision of a Belgian priest, Peter Vertenten, who had previously worked in Belgian Congo.
In August 1943, a small outpost of the Australian army under the command of an infantry sergeant was established there, as part of the defense of Merauke against a possible Japanese invasion. After the Dutch withdrawal from Western New Guinea in 1962, it became part of Indonesia.

Climate
Okaba has a tropical savanna climate (Aw) with heavy rainfall from November to May to and moderate to little rainfall from June to October.

References

Bibliography
 
 
 

Populated places in South Papua